Butte Meadows is a census-designated place in Butte County, California, 5 miles off State Route 32 on Humboldt Rd. The area code is Area code 530. The area is just over one mile (1.6 km) from the Tehama County line. The post office that served Butte Meadows moved back and forth across the county line several times from 1878 to 1888. Butte Meadows' population was 40 at the 2010 census.

The first annual Butte Meadows Snowshoe Sprint (BUMSS) was held on December 19, 2015. Reid Meadows, whose family lineage is indigenous to the area, was named champion after recording a 12.70 second 30-yard sprint in the final. The race was sponsored by the local establishment Bambi Inn.

Demographics

The 2010 United States Census reported that Butte Meadows had a population of 40. The population density was 18.6 people per square mile (7.2/km). The racial makeup of Butte Meadows was 38 (95.0%) White, 0 (0.0%) African American, 0 (0.0%) Native American, 0 (0.0%) Asian, 0 (0.0%) Pacific Islander, 0 (0.0%) from other races, and 2 (5.0%) from two or more races.  Hispanic or Latino of any race were 0 persons (0.0%).

The Census reported that 40 people (100% of the population) lived in households, 0 (0%) lived in non-institutionalized group quarters, and 0 (0%) were institutionalized.

There were 25 households, out of which 0 (0%) had children under the age of 18 living in them, 8 (32.0%) were opposite-sex married couples living together, 1 (4.0%) had a female householder with no husband present, 1 (4.0%) had a male householder with no wife present.  There were 1 (4.0%) unmarried opposite-sex partnerships, and 0 (0%) same-sex married couples or partnerships. 12 households (48.0%) were made up of individuals, and 5 (20.0%) had someone living alone who was 65 years of age or older. The average household size was 1.60.  There were 10 families (40.0% of all households); the average family size was 2.10.

The population was spread out, with 0 people (0%) under the age of 18, 1 people (2.5%) aged 18 to 24, 2 people (5.0%) aged 25 to 44, 25 people (62.5%) aged 45 to 64, and 12 people (30.0%) who were 65 years of age or older.  The median age was 58.0 years. For every 100 females age 18 and over, there were 207.7 males.

The homeowner vacancy rate was 7.7%; the rental vacancy rate was 78.8%.  29 people (72.5% of the population) lived in owner-occupied housing units and 11 people (27.5%) lived in rental housing units.

See also
Chester, California
Plumas National Forest
Lassen National Forest
Plumas County, California

References

 US Geological Survey, National Geographic Names Database
 US Census Bureau, 2000 census statistical area records
 Map: Butte Meadows, California, 7.5 minute quadrangle, 1995, US Geological Survey.

External links
Butte Meadows current weather and webcam

Census-designated places in Butte County, California
Populated places in the Sierra Nevada (United States)
Census-designated places in California